Ferrimonas balearica is a Gram-negative, non-spore-forming, facultatively anaerobic bacterium from the genus of Ferrimonas which has been isolated from sediments from the harbor of Palma de Mallorca in Spain.

References

Bacteria described in 1996
Alteromonadales